This is a list of hospitals in Taiwan, help improvement with it by adding in new information.

Medical Center

Changhua County 
Changhua Christian Hospital (彰化基督教醫院)

Kaohsiung City 
 Kaohsiung Medical University Chung-Ho Memorial Hospital
 Kaohsiung Veterans General Hospital
 Kaohsiung Chang Gung Memorial Hospital (高雄長庚紀念醫院)

Taichung City 
 China Medical University Hospital (中國醫藥大學附設醫院)
 Chun Shan Medical University Hospital (中山醫學大學附設醫院)
 Taichung Veterans General Hospital (台中榮民總醫院)

Tainan City 
 National Cheng Kung University Hospital
 Chi Mei Medical Center {奇美醫院}

Taipei City 
 Taipei Chang Gung Memorial Hospital (台北長庚紀念醫院)
 Central Clinic Hospital
 Mackay Memorial Hospital
 National Taiwan University Hospital
  (新光財團法人新光吳火獅紀念醫院)
 Taipei Veterans General Hospital
 Taiwan Adventist Hospital
 Tri-Service General Hospital
 Wan Fang Hospital (台北市立萬芳醫院-委託財團法人台北醫學大學辦理)

Taoyuan City
 Linkou Chang Gung Memorial Hospital (林口長庚紀念醫院)

Local Hospital

Changhua 
Show Chwan Memorial Hospital (秀傳紀念醫院)

Chiayi 
 Chiayi Chang Gung Memorial Hospital, (嘉義長庚紀念醫院)
 Chiayi Christian Hospital (CYCH 嘉義基督教醫院)
 St. Martin De Porres Hospital(STM 天主教聖馬爾定醫院)

Hualien 
 Mennonite Christian Hospital (臺灣基督教門諾醫院)

Kaohsiung 
 Kaohsiung Municipal Hsiao-Kang Hospital (高雄小港醫院)

Keelung 
 Keelung Chang Gung Memorial Hospital (基隆長庚紀念醫院)

Taichung 
 Cheng Ching Hospital (澄清醫院)
 Jen-Ai Hospital - Dali (大里仁愛醫院)
 Jen-Ai Hospital - Taichung (台中仁愛醫院)
 Taichung Tzu Chi General Hospital (台中慈濟醫院)

Tainan 
 Tainan Hospital
 Shinyin Hospital
 Sin Lau Hospital (The Presbyterian Church in Taiwan)

Taipei City
 Central Clinic and Hospital
 Taipei Medical University Hospital

New Taipei City 
 Fu Jen Catholic University Hospital (輔仁大學附設醫院)
 Hsiao Chung-Cheng Hospital 蕭中正醫院
 Cardinal Tien Hospital 天主教耕莘醫院 新店
 Taipei Tzu Chi General Hospital (台北慈濟醫院)

Taitung 
 Guanshan Tzu Chi General Hospital (關山慈濟醫院)

Taoyuan 
 Min-Sheng General Hospital (敏盛綜合醫院)
 Taoyuan Chang Gung Memorial Hospital (桃園長庚紀念醫院)

Chiayi 
 Dalin Tzu Chi General Hospital (大林慈濟醫院)

Municipal Hospital
Taipei City
 Taipei City Hospital System 台北市立聯合醫院系統
 Zhongxing Branch 中興院區
 Renai Branch 仁愛院區
 Heping Fuyou Branch 和平婦幼院區 (Children's Hospital)
 Yangming Branch 陽明院區
 Zhongxiao Branch 忠孝院區
 Songde Branch 松德院區
 Kunming Branch 昆明院區
 Chinese Medicine Clinic Center 中國醫學門診中心
 Linsen Chinese Medicine Branch 林森中國醫學院區
New Taipei City
 Taipei Hospital
 New Taipei City Hospital 新北市立聯合醫院
 Sanchung Branch 三重院區
 Banciao Branch 板橋院區
Tainan City
 Tainan Municipal Hospital 台南市立醫院
 Tainan Municipal An-Nan Hospital 臺南市立安南醫院
Kaohsiung City
 Kaohsiung Municipal United Hospital 高雄市立聯合醫院
 Kaohsiung Municipal Min-Sheng Hospital 高雄市立民生醫院
 Kaohsiung Municipal Kai-Syuan Psychiatric Hospital 高雄市立凱旋醫院
 Kaohsiung Municipal Chinese Medical Hospital 高雄市立中國醫學醫院
 Kaohsiung Municipal Ta-Tung Hospital 高雄市立大同醫院
 Kaohsiung Municipal Fengshan Hospital 高雄市立鳳山醫院
 Kaohsiung Municipal Gangshan Hospital 高雄市立岡山醫院
 Kaohsiung Municipal Hsiao-Kang Hospital 高雄市立小港醫院

See also
 Healthcare in Taiwan
 Nursing in Taiwan

References

External links

行政院衛生署91-95年度醫院評鑑暨教學醫院評鑑合格名單

 
Taiwan
Hospitals
Taiwan